Moxos is a province in the Beni Department, Bolivia. It is named after the Moxos savanna.

The province consists of one municipality, San Ignacio de Moxos Municipality, which is identical to the province. The province is divided into three cantons:

 San Francisco Canton - 2,684 inhabitants (2001)
 San Ignacio Canton - 17,387 inhabitants 
 San Lorenzo Canton - 1,572 inhabitants

Places of interest
 Isiboro Sécure National Park and Indigenous Territory

See also
 Llanos de Moxos
 Llanos de Moxos (archaeology)
 Moxos people
 Moxos language
Villa Tunari – San Ignacio de Moxos Highway

External links 
 San Ignacio de Moxos Municipality (= Moxos Province): population data and map

Provinces of Beni Department